Sarah Mellouk (born 21 August 1998 in Trelleborg) is a Swedish footballer who plays for Malmö FF in the Division 1. Mellouk is of Algerian descent.

Honours
Rosengård
Winner
 Damallsvenskan(2): 2013, 2014

Umeå
Winner
 Elitettan(2): 2019, 2021

'''Jitex
Winner
 Division 1 Mellersta Götaland(2): 2017, 2018

References

External links
 

1998 births
Damallsvenskan players
Living people
Jitex BK players
Sweden women's youth international footballers
Swedish women's footballers
Swedish people of Algerian descent
FC Rosengård players
Umeå IK players
People from Trelleborg
Women's association footballers not categorized by position